James Lawrence Deidel (born June 6, 1949, in Denver, Colorado) is a former Major League Baseball catcher. He bats and throws right-handed.

Deidel was drafted by the New York Yankees in the 15th round (126th overall) of the 1967 Major League Baseball Draft. He had two at-bats, in two games, going 0–2.

Deidel attended Mullen High School in Denver where he lettered in several sports and Colorado State University in Fort Collins. He had football scholarship offers to several major college programs as a quarterback but opted to accept the Yankees' signing bonus and pursue a professional baseball career instead.

In addition to his brief stint with the Yankees as a backup catcher to Thurman Munson, Deidel played nine years in the Yankees' farm system including seasons at Johnson City, Tennessee, Oneonta, New York, Kinston, NC, and West Haven, CT. He ended his career in the mid-1970s after several seasons in the AAA International League at Syracuse, New York. He played under manager Bobby Cox at West Haven and Syracuse.

External links

1949 births
Living people
Baseball players from Denver
Greensboro Yankees players
Johnson City Yankees players
Kinston Eagles players
Major League Baseball catchers
New York Yankees players
Oneonta Yankees players
Syracuse Chiefs players
West Haven Yankees players